The Glory is a South Korean streaming television series written by Kim Eun-sook and directed by Ahn Gil-ho. Song Hye-kyo, Lee Do-hyun, Lim Ji-yeon, Yeom Hye-ran, Park Sung-hoon, and Jung Sung-il round out the ensemble cast. Part 1 was released on Netflix on December 30, 2022, and Part 2 was released on March 10, 2023.

Premise 
A former victim of school violence seeks revenge on her bullies after taking up a job as a homeroom teacher at the elementary school of the bully's child.

Cast

Main 
 Song Hye-kyo as Moon Dong-eun
 Jung Ji-so as young Moon Dong-eun
 The homeroom teacher of Class 1-2 of Semyeong Elementary School. During her high school days, she was the target of constant bullying and physical abuse by Yeon-jin and her group. She eventually quit school and then started an elaborate plan of revenge on Yeon-jin's group.
 Lee Do-hyun as Joo Yeo-jeong
 A plastic surgeon who worked at the Seoul Joo General Hospital, where his mother is the director. He teaches Dong-eun Go.
 Lim Ji-yeon as Park Yeon-jin
 Shin Ye-eun as young Park Yeon-jin
 A weather presenter at a television station. She led the group of delinquents in bullying and physically abusing Dong-eun during high school.
 Yeom Hye-ran as Kang Hyeon-nam
 A housekeeper who worked at the home of Semyeong Foundation's president. She, along with her daughter, suffers from domestic violence perpetrated by her husband. She helps Dong-eun in the latter's revenge by becoming her sleuth, in exchange for the killing of her husband.
 Park Sung-hoon as Jeon Jae-joon
 Song Byeong-geun as young Jeon Jae-joon
 The colour blind heir of a country club. He was part of the group that constantly abused Dong-eun.
Jung Sung-il as Ha Do-yeong
 Yeon-jin's husband and CEO of Jaepyeong Construction. He is caught in the long-planned trap of Dong-eun and encounters Pandora's Box that threatens the happiness of his family.

Supporting

Sunghan High School (2004–2006) 
 Cha Joo-young as Choi Hye-jeong
 Song Ji-woo as young Choi Hye-jeong
 A flight attendant whose parents are owners of a self-service laundry. She was part of the group that constantly abused Dong-eun, although she was one of the lowest authority in the group as she lacked a prestigious background.
 Kim Hi-eora as Lee Sa-ra
 Bae Kang-hee as young Lee Sa-ra
 A member of the choir of a church led by her wealthy pastor father. Growing up, she developed a severe drug addiction and has a career as a famous abstract painter. She was part of the group that constantly abused Dong-eun.
 Kim Gun-woo as Son Myeong-oh  
 Seo Woo-hyuk young Son Myeong-oh
 He was part of the group that constantly abused Dong-eun. Growing up, without the connections or education afforded by financial privilege, he works as an errand boy for Jae-joon and a drug dealer for Sa-ra.
Lee So-ee as Yoon So-hee
 A Sunghan High School student who was the target of constant bullying and abuse by Yeon-jin's group before Dong-eun became the next target.
Jeon Soo-ah as Ahn Jung-mi 
 The school nurse at Sunghan High School. She was the only adult who supports Dong-eun at school.
Park Yoon-hee as Kim Jong-moon 
 Dong-eun's former homeroom teacher at Sunghan High School. He showed favouritism toward Yeon-jin's group and abused Dong-eun because he had taken bribes from their parents.
 Ahn So-yo as Kim Kyung-ran 
 Lee Seo-young as young Kim Kyung-ran
 A shop assistant at a boutique owned by Jae-joon. During her high school days, she became the next target of constant bullying by Yeon-jin's group after Dong-eun quit school.

People around Park Yeon-jin 
 Oh Ji-yul as Ha Ye-sol 
 The daughter of Yeon-jin and Do-yeong, although her biological father is Jae-joon. She is colour blind. She attends Semyeong Elementary School Class 1-2.
Yoon Da-kyung as Hong Young-ae 
 Yeon-jin's mother who believes in Korean shamanism.
 Lee Hae-young as Shin Young-joon
 A high-ranking police officer who is friends with Young-ae. He and his subordinates work behind the scenes to cover up Yeon-jin's crimes.

People around Moon Dong-eun 
 Park Ji-ah as Jung Mi-hee
 Dong-eun's mother who worked at a barbershop. She abandoned her daughter in favour of bribes. Has severe alcohol dependency.
Heo Dong-won as Chu Jeong-ho
 A teacher in Semyeong Elementary School who has tensions with Dong-eun.
Kang Gil-woo as Kim Soo-han 
 Dong-eun's senior who is also Jong-moon's son.
 Son Sook as Grandmother
 Manager of an estate office and owner of Eden Villa in Semyeong, where Dong-eun rents an apartment.
Son Na-young as Goo Sung-hee
 A travel agency employee who worked at the same factory with Dong-eun.

People around Kang Hyeon-nam 
 Choi Soo-in as Lee Seon-ah
 Hyeon-nam's daughter, who, along her mother, suffers from physical abuse by her father.
Ryu Seong-hyun as Lee Seok-jae
 Hyeon-nam's husband, who physically abused his daughter and wife. He also gambled and became an alcoholic.

People around Joo Yeo-jeong 
 Kim Jung-young as Park Sang-im
 Yeo-jeong's mother who is also the current director of Seoul Joo General Hospital.
 Cho Min-wook as Kim Jong-heon 
 Yeo-jeong's senior.
Choi Kwang-il as Joo Sung-hak
 Yeo-jeong's father, and was the chief director of Seoul Joo General Hospital. He was murdered by Yeong-cheon.

Others 
Lee Byung-jun as Lee Gil-sung
 A pastor and Sa-ra's father.
 Son Kang-kuk as Choi Dong-kyu
 A detective.
 Noh Kyung (Part 2)
 Kim Seon-hwa as Lee Sa-ra's mother

Special appearance 
 Hwang Kwang-hee as radio show host
 Lee Moo-saeng as Kang Yeong-cheon
 A patient who murdered Yeo-jeong's father.
 Lee Joong-ok as Tae-wook
 Hye-jeong's lover.
 Kim Seung-hwa as Hye-jeong's junior

Episodes

Production

Development 
Preparation for the series began in January 2021. Entirely pre-produced by Hwa&Dam Pictures and its parent company Studio Dragon, it is a Netflix original series. It is said that the series will be produced in two seasons, 8 episodes per season for a total of 16 episodes.

On December 20, 2022, the director announced at the drama's press conference that Part 2 will be released in March 2023.

Casting 
In July 2022, The Glory confirmed production with ensemble casting of Song Hye-kyo, Lee Do-hyun, Lim Ji-yeon, Yeom Hye-ran, Park Sung-hoon, and Jung Sung-il.

Reception

Audience response 
Two days after its release, The Glory ranked ninth globally on Netflix's TV shows category. On its third day, it reached fifth place on the most watched shows on Netflix worldwide. The series debuted at number three on the Netflix's Weekly Global Top 10 in non-English tv show category for the week December 26 – January 1, with 25.41 million hours viewed and subsequently ranked number one of the same list in the following week, January 2–8, accumulating 82.48 million viewing hours.

The series now ranked among the top 10 all-time Non-English TV series at #9 with 289.24 million hours watched in the first 28 days of release.

Critical response 
On review aggregation website Rotten Tomatoes, The Glory has an approval rating of 100% with an average rating of 8.30/10, based on 5 reviews.

Writing for Forbes, Joan MacDonald praised Song Hye-kyo for her "nuanced portrayal of Dong-eun" as well as Jung Ji-so who played teen Dong-eun, and wrote "The Glory features a fair share of unexpected plot twists, veering the story from almost horror to melodrama to murder mystery." Lakshana N Palat in his review for The Indian Express, praised the series' cinematography, music, and Song Hye-kyo's performance, stating, "It is one of her finest performances, if not her best." Chris Vognar of San Francisco Chronicle called the series "visually arresting", "carefully constructed" and "delights in every step". 

Jonathon Wilson reviewing for Ready Steady Cut gave 3.5 stars out of 5, and praised Song Hye-kyo, stating, "The script asks a lot from her, and she delivers it, capably carrying Part 1's action on her shoulders," but wrote that the brutal torment of school violence made the series "an unpleasant watch." Pierce Conran of South China Morning Post graded the series with 4 out of 5, appreciating its storyline.

References

External links 
 
 
 

Korean-language Netflix original programming
Television series by Hwa&Dam Pictures
2022 web series debuts
Television series about bullying
Television series about revenge
2023 South Korean television series endings
South Korean drama web series
2022 South Korean television series debuts
Television shows written by Kim Eun-sook
South Korean thriller television series